USNA may refer to:
United States Naval Academy
United Service for New Americans, an aid organization to help resettle Jewish survivor of World War II
United States of North America (disambiguation)
United States National Army

See also
Usna (Deirdre legend)